Marius La Grange (born 30 September 1964) is a South African cricketer. He played in one List A and eight first-class matches for Boland in 1986/87 and 1987/88.

See also
 List of Boland representative cricketers

References

External links
 

1964 births
Living people
South African cricketers
Boland cricketers
Cricketers from Paarl